The Great Indian Laughter Challenge is an Indian reality stand-up comedy series produced by Endemol India. The first four seasons aired on STAR One from 15 June 2005 to 26 September 2008.
The show's fifth season premiered on 30 September 2017 on STAR Plus and was judged by Akshay Kumar.

The show is based on a format where stand-up comedians perform and entertain judges and the studio audience with their comedy skills. The first three seasons of the show saw Shekhar Suman, an eminent TV personality and Navjot Singh Sidhu, former cricketer, cricket color commentator and Punjab politician." The show's initial episodes were hosted by Parizaad Kolah Marshall and later she was replaced by Shonali Nagrani. The fifth season is being hosted by Elli Avram. The set was designed by noted Bollywood production designer Nitin Chandrakant Desai. In the fourth season Shatrughan Sinha replaced Navjot Singh Sidhu as judge.as per season .

Seasons
In the first season, Sunil Pal was the winner, Ahsaan Qureshi was runner up and Raju Srivastava was second runner up. In the second season contestants from Pakistan were present and the winner Rauf Lala was from Pakistan. The third season was won by Kapil Sharma and the first runner up was Chandan Prabhakar both from Amritsar. Many other talented comedians like Siraj Khan, Sudesh Lehari, Rajiv Thakur, Bharti Singh, Navin Prabhakar, Jassi Kochar, Khayaali, Dipoo Srivastava, Ahsaan Qureshi have appeared in the show.

The first two seasons were followed by another show, The Great Indian Laughter Champions, which included top performers of the previous shows. Here also the judges were Sidhu and Shekar including some celebrity guests as well.

Recently the first woman to participate was Aarti Kandpal. The fourth season's finalists were Rasbihari Gaur, Bharti Singh, Suresh Albela, and a duo Sikander Sanam-Wali Sheikh (veteran stage comedians from Pakistan). The winner for the fourth season after a tough laughter war was Suresh Albela.

Season 5 had 3 mentors Zakir Khan, Hussain Dalal and Mallika Dua later replaced by Sajid Khan and Shreyas Talpade who along with Akshay Kumar, will select 12 finalists who will compete for the title.

Season I 2005

 Sunil Pal
Ahsaan Qureshi (First Runner-up) 
Raju Srivastava (Second Runner-up) 
 Naveen Prabhakar
 Bhagwant Mann 
 Parag Kansara

Season II 2006
 Rauf Lala  (Pakistan)
 Rajeev Nigam (Runner-up)
 Khayali 
 Pratap Faujdar
 Irfan Malik and Ali Hassan (Pakistan) 
 Amanullah (Guest Appearance)
 Dr. Tushar Shah 
 Rajkumar Javkar
 Saransh Bhardwaj  (guest appearance)
 Gaurav K. Jha

Season III 2007
 Kapil Sharma 
Chandan Prabhakar ( Second Runner-up)
Sudesh Lehri ( Runner-up)
Deepak Saini
Rajeev Thakur
 Parvez Siddiqui (Pakistan)

Season IV 2008

Suresh Albela 
 Sikandar Sanam (First Runner-up) (Pakistan)
 Bharti Singh (Second runner-up)
  Rasbihari Gaur (Third runner-up)
 Sunil Thakkar (Houston, TX)
 Wali Sheikh (Pakistan)
 Jaswant Singh 
 Srikant Maski
 Ramdas Yeole 
 Rehan Jamal (Pakistan) 
 Sugandha Mishra 
 Vinod Rathore
 Anirudh Madesia

Season V - 2017
Abhishek Walia  
 Nitesh Shetty(Runner up) 
Vighnesh Pande
 Mohd Anas
 Parvindar Singh
Vishwash Chauhan
 Shyam Rangeela
 Abhay Kumar
 Naman Jain
 Sumit Sourav
 Shikha Singh
 Vidushi Swaroop
 Ajay Singh Chauhan
Gaurav Gupta
Jayvijay Sachan

References

External links
 The Great Indian Laughter Challenge on Hotstar

Star One (Indian TV channel) original programming
StarPlus original programming
Indian stand-up comedy television series
2005 Indian television series debuts
2010s Indian television series
Hindi-language television shows